Mike Lindemann Jensen (born 19 February 1988) is a Danish professional footballer who plays as a midfielder for Danish 1st Division club HB Køge. He has also been capped by Denmark.

Jensen joined the Brøndby youth academy at age 13, and made his professional debut for the club in the 2006–07 season as a promising talent. After a loan to Malmö FF, he grew into a key figure on the Brøndby team, making well above 100 appearances for the club. In February 2013, Jensen left for Norway to play for top tier club Rosenborg. There, he became team captain and was part of the squads winning four league titles and three Norwegian Cups.

Jensen made his senior international debut for Denmark in August 2010.

Club career

Brøndby
The son of former Brøndby player Henrik Jensen, Mike Jensen moved to the Brøndby youth academy at age 13 from BK Rødovre. In 2006, he was promoted to the first team. He made his professional debut in the Danish Superliga on 13 August 2006 in a 1–1 draw against Randers, where he came on for Martin Ericsson in the 85th minute. On 28 September 2006, he made his European debut in the second leg of the first qualifying round of the UEFA Cup against Eintracht Frankfurt (2–2); he came on in the 86th minute for Thomas Rasmussen. In the league, he made 11 appearances during the 2006–07 season, as he won the 2006 Danish U19 Player of the Year award. He scored his first senior goal in the 3–1 win over Silkeborg. In the following season, he made 13 appearances.

In July 2008, Jensen moved on loan to Allsvenskan club Malmö FF on a six-month deal and made 10 appearances. After the loan deal ended, he returned to Brøndby and found himself on the bench again, but became a regular during the 2009–10 season. With Brøndby, he failed to qualify for the group stage of the 2010–11 UEFA Europa League with the team being knocked out by Portuguese club Sporting CP in the play-off round.

Rosenborg
After Brøndby and Jensen could not agree on a contract extension in early 2013, he moved to Norwegian club Rosenborg BK in February 2013. On 17 March 2013, he played his first game for the Trondheim club in the away match against Odd on the first matchday and scored his first goal for his club in the 71st minute, which was also the 1–0 winner. With Rosenborg, Jensen regularly qualified for the Europa League and the Champions League, without advancing from the group stages.

In October 2015, Jensen won the 2015 Tippeligaen with Rosenborg. One month later, in November, Rosenborg secured the Norwegian double, when Jensen scored the final goal against Sarpsborg 08 in the Norwegian Football Cup final of 2015. Rosenborg won the match 2–0. He would also go on the win the 2016, 2017 and 2018 editions of the highest Norwegian league. Jensen was appointed team captain in January 2016, and he signed a five-year contract extension the following month.

Jensen made 285 total appearances for Rosenborg in which he scored 52 goals during his seven years at the club.

APOEL
On 11 January 2020, Jensen signed a contract with Cypriot club APOEL to 2021. On 22 December 2020, Jensen and APOEL agreed to terminate the contract, making Jensen a free agent.

HB Køge
On 1 February 2021, Jensen signed a three-and-a-half-year contract with second-tier Danish 1st Division club HB Køge on a free transfer. He made his debut on 13 February in a 1–1 league draw against Hobro IK, playing the full 90 minutes. The following week, Jensen scored his first goal for Køge in a 3–1 away win over Skive IK.

International career
In May 2018 he was named in Denmark’s preliminary 35-man squad for the 2018 World Cup in Russia but did not make the final 23.

Career statistics

Club

Honours
Brøndby
Danish Cup: 2007–08
Royal League: 2006–07

Rosenborg
Norwegian League: 2015, 2016, 2017, 2018 
Norwegian Football Cup: 2015, 2016, 2018
Mesterfinalen: 2017, 2018

Individual
Eliteserien Player of the Year: 2016
Eliteserien Midfielder of the Year: 2016

Eliteserien Top assist provider: 2015

References

External links
Danish national team profile 
Rosenborg BK profile 
Official Danish Superliga statistics 

1988 births
Living people
Danish men's footballers
Denmark international footballers
Denmark youth international footballers
Denmark under-21 international footballers
Brøndby IF players
Malmö FF players
Rosenborg BK players
APOEL FC players
HB Køge players
Danish Superliga players
Allsvenskan players
Eliteserien players
Cypriot First Division players
Danish 1st Division players
Expatriate footballers in Sweden
Expatriate footballers in Norway
Expatriate footballers in Cyprus
Danish expatriate sportspeople in Norway
Danish expatriate sportspeople in Sweden
Danish expatriate sportspeople in Cyprus
Association football midfielders
People from Herlev Municipality
Sportspeople from the Capital Region of Denmark